Rudi Koegler (born 1931 in Amsterdam) is a Dutch painter. His work is characterized by a development from figurative art to abstract art, and by the recurrent themes of movement and light. He taught at the Casimirlyceum in Amstelveen and at high schools in Zwolle. For a long time he worked closely together with Jaap Hillenius.

Periods 
Koegler's work can be divided in four periods.

During the first period, from 1957 to 1970, the focus is on expressionistic landscapes. The used technique is oil-paint à la prime.
In his second period, from 1970 to 1975, Koegler's subject is the emotion evoked by a human being in a space. As expressive devices he uses direction, volume, rhythm and color.
 The theme of the third period, 1975–1985, is the color of light, reflected by water and vegetation. Direction and shape of brushstrokes obtain a meaning in relation to their color.
From 1985 until present time Koegler creates complex rhythmical fabrics of visual elements. The influence of music during this period is considerable.

Exhibitions 
1959 - Zwolle, Hopmanhuis
1960 - Zwolle, De Nijvere Konste
1977 - Amstelveen, Aemstelle
1980 - Westzaan, Eck, Wiel
1981 - Hoorn, Alkmaar, Zaandam, Bergen
1998 - Cobramuseum, Amstelveen
2009 - Chassékerk, Amsterdam

Bibliography 
Ode aan de Rondehoep (Tribute to the Rondehoep), Amsterdam, 2000.
Rudi Koegler - Tekenleraar met het oog op kunst (Tutor with a view to art), Amsterdam, 2009.

External links 
Rudi Koegler - Tutor with a view to art

1931 births
Living people
Dutch painters
Dutch male painters
Painters from Amsterdam